Hoseynabad (also Romanized as Ḩoseynābād; also known as Husainābād) is a village in Qohrud Rural District, Qamsar District, Kashan County, Isfahan Province, Iran. At the 2006 census, its population was 79, in 25 families.

References 

Populated places in Kashan County